Guna district is one of the 52 districts of Madhya Pradesh in central India. Its administrative headquarters is Guna. The district has a population of 1,241,519 (2011 census). It has an area of 6390 km², and is bounded on the northeast by Shivpuri District, on the east by Ashoknagar District, on the southeast by Vidisha District, on the southwest by Rajgarh District, on the west and northwest by Jhalawar and Baran districts of Rajasthan state. The Sindh River flows northward along the eastern edge of the district, forming part of the boundary with Ashoknagar District, and the Parvati River flows northwestward through the southern portion of the district, forming part of the boundary with Baran District before flowing into Rajasthan.

On 15 August 2003 Guna District was split in two, with the eastern portion becoming Ashoknagar District.

Guna was part of the ancient Avanti Kingdom founded by Chand Pradyota Mahesena. Later Shishusangh added the kingdom of Avant, which included Guna to the growing empire of Magadha. In the early 18th century, Guna was conquered by the Maratha leader Ramoji Rao Scindia, and remained part of the Kingdom of Gwalior until shortly after Indian independence. Guna was administered as part of the kingdom's Isagarh District. In 1897 the Indian Midland Railway constructed a rail route passing through Guna. After India gained independence, Guna became part of the new state of Madhya Bharat on 28 May 1948 as one of its 16 districts. On 1 November 1956, Madhya Bharat was merged into Madhya Pradesh state.

Geography 

Guna is located at 24.65°N 77.32°E.[1] It has an average elevation of 474 metres (1555 ft).

Guna district of Madhya Pradesh is the gateway of Malwa and Chambal. It is located on the north-eastern part of Malwa Plateau. Western boundary of the District is well defined by Parbati river. Parvati is the main river flowing along the western boundary touching Rajgarh District of Madhya Pradesh, and Jhalawarh and Kota Districts of Rajasthan. Towns Shivpuri and Kota are located in north and the cities Vidisha, Bhopal, and Rajgarh lie to the South. The eastern boundary of district define by Sindh river.

Sub-Divisions 
 Guna 
 Raghavgarh-Vijaypur
 Aron
 Chachoda
 Madhusudangarh

Blocks
 Guna
 Raghogarh
 Aron
 Chachaura

Assembly Constituencies
There are 4 Madhya Pradesh Vidhan Sabha constituencies located in this district. Two of them, Bamori and Guna are part of Guna Lok Sabha constituency and the other two, Chachoura and Raghogarh are part of Rajgarh Lok Sabha constituency.

Demographics

According to the 2011 census Guna District has a population of 1,241,519, roughly equal to the nation of Trinidad and Tobago or the US state of New Hampshire. This gives it a ranking of 388th in India (out of a total of 640). 

Its population growth rate over the decade 2001-2011 was 26.91%. Guna has a sex ratio of 910 females for every 1000 males, and a literacy rate of 65.1%. 25.18% of the population live in urban areas. Scheduled Castes and Tribes made up 15.55% and 15.37% of the population respectively.

Hindi is the predominant language, spoken by 99.39% of the population.

As of 2011 India census, Guna City has a population of 180,978. Males constitute 52.29% of the population and females 47.71%. Guna has an average literacy rate of 81.7%, In Guna, 13% of the population is under 6 years of age. Hanumaan Tekri is a famous temple in Guna. This temple place is on a hill. The famous Fort of Maharaja Jai Singh is located in Bajrangarh (8 km from Guna). The village also has a famous Jain Temple called Jain Atishay Kshetra. NH3 also passes via Guna. Guna is the constituency for Jyotiraditya Scindia.

See also
Bajrangarh Fort, a 1617th-century fort in the Guna District, local outing place.Hanuman tekri is also a famous temple.
Naderī satī stone inscription, an epigraphic record

References

External links
Guna District website

 Waterparks in Guna

http://Instagram.com/gunadistrict

 
Districts of Madhya Pradesh